The 2012 Galway Senior Hurling Championship was the 115th staging of the Galway Senior Hurling Championship since its establishment in 1887. The championship began on 28 April 2013 and ended on 18 November 2012.  An otherwise entertaining game was made infamous by some unruly incidents most notably a stamping by one of the St Thomas' players Richie Murray where he was seen to stamp on the Loughrea full back and the infamous Johnny Maher striking incident which later became a YouTube sensation.

St. Thomas's were appearing in their first ever final having overcome reigning champions Gort 1-16 to 1-15 at the semi-final stage.

Results

Semi-finals

Final

References

Galway Senior Hurling Championship
Galway Senior Hurling Championship